Boitze is a municipality in the district of Lüneburg, in Lower Saxony, Germany. Boitze has an area of 25.41 km² and a population of 416 (as of December 31, 2007).

References